Berentin (also Romanized as Berenţīn) is a village in Berentin Rural District, Central District, Rudan County, Hormozgan Province, Iran. At the 2006 census, its population was 4,971, in 1,002 families.

References 

Populated places in Rudan County